Benevento Calcio, commonly referred to as Benevento, is an Italian football club based in Benevento, Campania. The club was originally founded in 1929 and then re-founded in 2005. They currently compete in Serie B, having been relegated from Serie A in the 2020–21 season.

History

Early history
The club was founded as Associazione Calcio Benevento in 1929, their original home was the Meomartini which was built by Ciccio Minocchia.

After working their way up the country's lower divisions during their early years, Benevento reached Prima Divisione, Italy's third highest professional league at the time, in the 1934–35 season. They finished above clubs such as Reggina during the club's first season within the league. Although they did not win promotion to Serie B, the team did remain in the third tier of Italian football for the 1935–36 season, re-organized to a smaller 64-team league renamed Serie C.

21st century
The club F.C. Sporting Benevento S.r.l. folded in 2005. At the same time Benevento Calcio S.p.A. was founded, using the same stadium and playing kit.

In the 2007–08 Serie C2 regular season the team finished first in Girone C, winning direct promotion to the now called Lega Pro Prima Divisione for the 2008–09 season. In the 2008–09 season, Benevento's first season in Lega Pro Prima Divisione, they finished in 2nd place. This meant Benevento would be in a two-legged play-off. They won their first two-legged play-off, but lost to Crotone 1–0 (2–1) on aggregate in the final.

Gaetano Auteri was appointed as the head manager for the 2015–16 season. In this season, Benevento won its league and reached Serie B for the first time in its history. The mathematical certainty arrived on 30 April 2016, after defeating Lecce 3–0.

On 8 June 2017, they were promoted to Serie A, for the first time in their history, after defeating Carpi in the Serie B play-offs 1–0 on aggregate, remarkably winning promotion in their inaugural season in Serie B. The club struggled in its top-flight debut in the 2017-18 season as Benevento set a record for the worst start to a season in any of Europe's top five leagues by losing their first 14 Serie A matches. This streak ended on 3 December 2017, with a 95th-minute equalising header from goalkeeper Alberto Brignoli for a 2–2 home draw against A.C. Milan. Benevento's time in Serie A lasted one season and they were relegated after a last-place finish, although there was a clear uptick in form after their dismal opening to the campaign, ultimately winning six of their last 23 games.

On 22 June 2019, Benevento hired Filippo Inzaghi as their new manager. In June 2020, with seven matches still left in the league season, the club won promotion back to the first-division of Italian football following an impressive Serie B campaign.

Benevento's second season in Serie A was again unsuccessful, ending with another relegation, but the club was much more competitive and performed particularly admirably in the first half of the season. By the campaign's midway point, Benevento had won six matches and was placed in 10th position, appearing well-set for a mid-table finish. However, a dramatic downturn in form from January until the end of the campaign, scoring only 16 goals and winning just one of the final 22 matches in that time, meant that the club again fell back into Serie B for the 2021-22 season. Benevento eventually finished in 18th place, with four points fewer than Torino in the final non-relegation position.

Colours and badge
The team's colours are yellow and red, and their badge features red and yellow stripes and the black image of a witch riding a broom. Benevento are nicknamed the Stregoni, Italian for sorcerers, or occasionally, the Streghe, Italian for witches, a reference to the legends dating to the 13th century of the witches of Benevento.

Stadium
Benevento plays their home matches at the Stadio Ciro Vigorito. Building on the stadium broke ground in 1976 and it was opened in 1979. It is able to hold 25,000 people.

The stadium was originally named Santa Colomba but was renamed to honor Ciro Vigorito who was the brother of club president Oreste Vigorito. Ciro was a successful entrepreneur and sports manager who was the managing director and oversaw the youth sector at Benevento from 2006 until his death in 2010.

Players

Current squad

Out on loan

Coaching staff

Notable former players

World Cup players
The following players have been selected by their country in the World Cup Finals, while playing for Benevento.

  Massamasso Tchangai (2006)
  Kamil Glik (2022)

Notable former managers

 Giuseppe Zilizzi (1935–36)
 Giuseppe Viani (1945–46)
 Francisco Lojacono (1974–75)
 Gastone Bean (1981–83)
 Giuseppe Materazzi (1984–85)
 Adriano Lombardi (1995–96)
 Massimo Silva (1996–98)
 Nello Di Costanzo (2002–04)
 Giovanni Simonelli (2006–08)
 Antonio Soda (2008–09)
 Leonardo Acori (2009)
 Andrea Camplone (2009–10)
 Leonardo Acori (2010)
 Giuseppe Galderisi (2010–11)
 Giovanni Simonelli (2011)
 Carmelo Imbriani (2011–12)
 Guido Ugolotti (2012–13)
 Guido Carboni (2013–14)
 Gaetano Auteri (2015–16)
 Marco Baroni (2016–17)
 Roberto De Zerbi (2017–2018)
 Cristian Bucchi (2018–2019)
 Filippo Inzaghi (2019–2021)
 Fabio Caserta (2021–2022)
 Fabio Cannavaro (2022–2023)

Honours
Serie B
Winners: 2019–20
Play-off winner: 2016–17

Serie C
Winners: 2015–16

Serie C2
Winners: 2007–08 Group C

References

External links

 Benevento Calcio official website

 
Football clubs in Italy
Football clubs in Campania
Association football clubs established in 1929
Serie A clubs
Serie B clubs
Serie C clubs
1929 establishments in Italy
Phoenix clubs (association football)